, the World Spider Catalog accepted the following genera in the family Araneidae:

Acacesia Simon, 1895
Acantharachne Tullgren, 1910
Acanthepeira Marx, 1883
Acroaspis Karsch, 1878
Acrosomoides Simon, 1887
Actinacantha Simon, 1864
Actinosoma Holmberg, 1883
Aculepeira Chamberlin & Ivie, 1942
Acusilas Simon, 1895
Aethriscus Pocock, 1902
Aethrodiscus Strand, 1913
Aetrocantha Karsch, 1879
Afracantha Dahl, 1914
Agalenatea Archer, 1951
Alenatea Song & Zhu, 1999
Allocyclosa Levi, 1999
Alpaida O. Pickard-Cambridge, 1889
Amazonepeira Levi, 1989
Anepsion Strand, 1929
Arachnura Vinson, 1863
Araneus Clerck, 1757
Araniella Chamberlin & Ivie, 1942
Aranoethra Butler, 1873
Argiope Audouin, 1826
Arkys Walckenaer, 1837
Artonis Simon, 1895
Aspidolasius Simon, 1887
Augusta O. Pickard-Cambridge, 1877
Austracantha Dahl, 1914
Backobourkia Framenau et al., 2010
Bertrana Keyserling, 1884
Caerostris Thorell, 1868
Carepalxis L. Koch, 1872
Celaenia Thorell, 1868
Cercidia Thorell, 1869
Chorizopes O. Pickard-Cambridge, 1870
Cladomelea Simon, 1895
Cnodalia Thorell, 1890
Coelossia Simon, 1895
Colaranea Court & Forster, 1988
Collina Urquhart, 1891
Colphepeira Archer, 1941
Cryptaranea Court & Forster, 1988
Cyclosa Menge, 1866
Cyphalonotus Simon, 1895
Cyrtarachne Thorell, 1868
Cyrtobill Framenau & Scharff, 2009
Cyrtophora Simon, 1864
Deione Thorell, 1898
Deliochus Simon, 1894
Demadiana Strand, 1929
Dolophones Walckenaer, 1837
Dubiepeira Levi, 1991
Edricus O. Pickard-Cambridge, 1890
Enacrosoma Mello-Leitão, 1932
Encyosaccus Simon, 1895
Epeiroides Keyserling, 1885
Eriophora Simon, 1864
Eriovixia Archer, 1951
Eustacesia Caporiacco, 1954
Eustala Simon, 1895
Exechocentrus Simon, 1889
Faradja Grasshoff, 1970
Friula O. Pickard-Cambridge, 1896
Galaporella Levi, 2009
Gasteracantha Sundevall, 1833
Gastroxya Benoit, 1962
Gea C. L. Koch, 1843
Gibbaranea Archer, 1951
Glyptogona Simon, 1884
Heterognatha Nicolet, 1849
Heurodes Keyserling, 1886
Hingstepeira Levi, 1995
Hypognatha Guérin, 1839
Hypsacantha Dahl, 1914
Hypsosinga Ausserer, 1871
Ideocaira Simon, 1903
Isoxya Simon, 1885
Kaira O. Pickard-Cambridge, 1889
Kapogea Levi, 1997
Kilima Grasshoff, 1970
Larinia Simon, 1874
Lariniaria Grasshoff, 1970
Larinioides Caporiacco, 1934
Leviellus Wunderlich, 2004
Lewisepeira Levi, 1993
Lipocrea Thorell, 1878
Macracantha Simon, 1864
Madacantha Emerit, 1970
Mahembea Grasshoff, 1970
Mangora O. Pickard-Cambridge, 1889
Manogea Levi, 1997
Mastophora Holmberg, 1876
Mecynogea Simon, 1903
Megaraneus Lawrence, 1968
Melychiopharis Simon, 1895
Metazygia F. O. Pickard-Cambridge, 1904
Metepeira F. O. Pickard-Cambridge, 1903
Micrathena Sundevall, 1833
Micrepeira Schenkel, 1953
Micropoltys Kulczy?ski, 1911
Milonia Thorell, 1890
Molinaranea Mello-Leitão, 1940
Nemoscolus Simon, 1895
Nemosinga Caporiacco, 1947
Nemospiza Simon, 1903
Neogea Levi, 1983
Neoscona Simon, 1864
Nicolepeira Levi, 2001
Novakiella Court & Forster, 1993
Novaranea Court & Forster, 1988
Nuctenea Simon, 1864
Ocrepeira Marx, 1883
Ordgarius Keyserling, 1886
Paralarinia Grasshoff, 1970
Paraplectana Brito Capello, 1867
Paraplectanoides Keyserling, 1886
Pararaneus Caporiacco, 1940
Parawixia F. O. Pickard-Cambridge, 1904
Parazygiella Wunderlich, 2004
Parmatergus Emerit, 1994
Pasilobus Simon, 1895
Perilla Thorell, 1895
Pherenice Thorell, 1899
Phonognatha Simon, 1894
Pitharatus Simon, 1895
Plebs Joseph & Framenau, 2012
Poecilarcys Simon, 1895
Poecilopachys Simon, 1895
Poltys C. L. Koch, 1843
Porcataraneus Mi & Peng, 2011
Pozonia Schenkel, 1953
Prasonica Simon, 1895
Prasonicella Grasshoff, 1971
Pronoides Schenkel, 1936
Pronous Keyserling, 1881
Pseudartonis Simon, 1903
Pseudopsyllo Strand, 1916
Psyllo Thorell, 1899
Pycnacantha Blackwall, 1865
Rubrepeira Levi, 1992
Scoloderus Simon, 1887
Sedasta Simon, 1894
Singa C. L. Koch, 1836
Singafrotypa Benoit, 1962
Siwa Grasshoff, 1970
Spilasma Simon, 1897
Spinepeira Levi, 1995
Spintharidius Simon, 1893
Stroemiellus Wunderlich, 2004
Taczanowskia Keyserling, 1879
Talthybia Thorell, 1898
Tatepeira Levi, 1995
Telaprocera Harmer & Framenau, 2008
Testudinaria Taczanowski, 1879
Thelacantha Hasselt, 1882
Thorellina Berg, 1899
Togacantha Dahl, 1914
Umbonata Grasshoff, 1971
Ursa Simon, 1895
Verrucosa McCook, 1888
Wagneriana F. O. Pickard-Cambridge, 1904
Witica O. Pickard-Cambridge, 1895
Wixia O. Pickard-Cambridge, 1882
Xylethrus Simon, 1895
Yaginumia Archer, 1960
Zealaranea Court & Forster, 1988
Zilla C. L. Koch, 1834
Zygiella F. O. Pickard-Cambridge, 1902

References

Taxonomic lists (genera, taxonomic)
Araneidae